Vuse is an electronic cigarette produced by R. J. Reynolds Vapor Company, a subsidiary of the Reynolds American tobacco company. In 2015, it was the most popular e-cigarette in the United States with 33% market share in Nielsen-tracked channels However, Vuse lost its top position in 2017, when Juul overtook it to become the most popular e-cigarette in the US. , Vuse controlled 10% percent of the American e-cigarette market, compared to Juul's 72% market share. By April 2022, Vuse was at 35% and Juul was at 33%.

The original Vuse digital vapor cigarette has a nicotine content of 4.8 percent, which is high compared to other e-cigarettes available in 2013.

History
R.J. Reynolds launched Vuse in a June 2013 press conference, the first time R.J. Reynolds launched a product with a press conference in two decades. R.J. Reynolds promoted Vuse with print, direct mail, and TV advertising, the latter of which is highly unusual for tobacco products in the United States. Vuse was launched in Colorado, but it quickly become available across the rest of the United States. In 2015, Jerod Harris filed a lawsuit against Vuse for "[failure] to inform customers of the potential health risks incurred by using the products; specifically, inhalation of the carcinogens formaldehyde and acetaldehyde," a violation of California state law.

In April 2018, R.J. Reynolds Vapor Company issued a recall of Vuse Vibe devices. It stated that the batteries of Vuse Vibe vaporizers were malfunctioning and overheating after injuries were reported. The cause of the malfunction has not been disclosed.

In August 2018, Vuse launched the Vuse Alto, a pod mod-type vaporizer, which is the variant of e-cigarette that Juul is. The Alto is marketed as a direct competitor to Juul.

In 2019, the US Food and Drug Administration started a review process to determine whether R.J. Reynolds Vapor Company's Vuse e-cigarette can claim that it is less risky than tobacco products.

However, in 2021 researchers at Johns Hopkins University analyzed the vape aerosols of popular brands such as Juul and Vuse, and found "nearly 2,000 chemicals, the vast majority of which are unidentified."

Motorsport sponsorship 
In 2019, British American Tobacco (BAT), parent company of Reynolds American, signed a partnership deal with McLaren under its A Better Tomorrow campaign to promote BAT brands Vuse and Velo. The partnership was later enchanced, including partnering with McLaren's IndyCar team. Vuse partnered with McLaren to race one-off liveries at the 2021 and 2022 Abu Dhabi Grand Prix featuring the works of Egyptian-born, UAE-based artist Rabab Tantawy and Lebanese artist Anna Tangles respectively.

References

External links

 Official website

Electronic cigarette brands
R. J. Reynolds Tobacco Company brands